Dinu Graur (born 27 December 1994) is a Moldovan professional footballer who last played as a defender for Greek club AEL and the Moldova national team. 

In his career, Graur played for clubs such as Zimbru Chișinău, Milsami Orhei or Astra Giurgiu.

Honours
Zimbru Chișinău
Moldovan Cup: 2013–14
Moldovan Super Cup (2): 2014,  2019

Notes

References

External links
 

1994 births
Living people
Footballers from Chișinău
Moldovan footballers
Moldova international footballers
Association football defenders
Moldovan Super Liga players
Liga I players
Super League Greece players
FC Zimbru Chișinău players
FC Milsami Orhei players
FC Astra Giurgiu players
Athlitiki Enosi Larissa F.C. players
Moldovan expatriate footballers
Moldovan expatriate sportspeople in Romania
Expatriate footballers in Romania
Moldovan expatriate sportspeople in Greece
Expatriate footballers in Greece